Interactive Theorem Proving (ITP) is an annual international academic conference on the topic of automated theorem proving, proof assistants and related topics, ranging from theoretical foundations to implementation aspects and applications in program verification, security, and formalization of mathematics.

ITP brings together the communities using many systems based on higher-order logic such as ACL2, Coq, Mizar, HOL, Isabelle, Lean, NuPRL, PVS, and Twelf. Individual workshops or meetings devoted to individual systems are usually held concurrently with the conference.

Together with CADE and TABLEAUX, ITP is usually one of the three main conferences of the International Joint Conference on Automated Reasoning (IJCAR) whenever it convenes,

History
The inaugural meeting of ITP was held on 11–14 July 2010 in Edinburgh, Scotland, as part of the Federated Logic Conference. It is the extension of the Theorem Proving in Higher Order Logics (TPHOLs) conference series to the broad field of interactive theorem proving. TPHOLs meetings took place every year from 1988 until 2009.

The first three were informal users' meetings for the HOL system and were the only ones without published papers. Since 1990 TPHOLs has published formal peer-reviewed proceedings, published by Springer's Lecture Notes in Computer Science series. It has also entertained an increasingly wide field of interest.

External links
 

Automated theorem proving
Theoretical computer science conferences
Logic conferences